Marty Riessen and Margaret Court were the defending champions but lost in the final 6–3, 3–6, 7–6 against Owen Davidson and Billie Jean King.

Seeds

Draw

Finals

Top half

Bottom half

Notes

References

External
1973 US Open – Doubles draws and results at the International Tennis Federation

Mixed Doubles
US Open (tennis) by year – Mixed doubles